South Carolina Highway 61 Connector may refer to:

South Carolina Highway 61 Connector (Charleston): An unsigned connector route in the West Ashley portion of Charleston
South Carolina Highway 61 Connector (Dorchester County): An unsigned connector route southwest of Summerville

061 Connector
061 Connector